The DP-64 Nepryadva is a Russian special-purpose double-barreled over/under grenade launcher designed to protect surfaced submarines, ships, dockyards, water development works, and other coastal installations from combat swimmers and naval special forces. The weapon is breech-loading and operates much like a large shotgun with a side-break breech, utilizing both direct and indirect iron sights. A large polymer stock and the barrels themselves makes up the bulk of the weapon. The barrels are selected by turning a lever accommodated above the trigger guard. A front pistol grip is equipped for support and is out of alignment with the rear grip and trigger mechanism, providing a more natural grip while firing indirectly. The butt is fitted with a springy rubber pad to diminish felt recoil. Direct fire sights are also provided for use from a helicopter allowing for large areas to be patrolled and protected from enemy combat swimmers. The grenade launcher was developed in 1989 and introduced in 1990.

The DP-64 grenade launcher is now in serial production, said Pavel Sidorov, a representative of NPO Bazalt, the designer of the DP-64, at the 2015 International Defense Exhibition (IDEX) in Abu Dhabi. Sidorov said that the company received a large order from Russia's Defense Ministry for the weapons. Previously, the DP-64 has only been built in small numbers for the Russian coast guard, Federal Security Service, and a handful of marine units.

Though large and somewhat unwieldy, the DP-64 serves an important role with few modern contemporaries in the small arms world.

Ammunition
 Caliber:  
 Overall length:  
 Projectile length:  
 Cartridge length:  
 Shell weight:  
 Cartridge type:  Rimmed, Separating base
FG-45 (ФГ-45) Fragmentation [ blast radius, to  depth]
SG-45 (СГ-45) Floating Flare (red) [for ~50 seconds] 
UG-45 (УГ-45) HE/Concussion

Users

See also
 FHJ-84 - outwardly similar looking Chinese weapon
 DP-65
 MRG-1
 GM-94
 RGM-40 Kastet
 RGSh-30
 List of grenade launchers
 List of Russian weaponry

References

Grenade launchers
Multiple-barrel firearms
Grenade launchers of the Soviet Union
Grenade launchers of Russia
Bazalt products
Military equipment introduced in the 1990s